The following is the qualification system and qualified athletes for the karate at the 2023 Pan American Games competitions.

Qualification system
A total of 106 karatekas will qualify to compete (96 qualified across four qualification tournaments and 10 extra nominal spots to the winners of the 2021 Junior Pan American Games. There will be nine athletes qualified in each individual event, excepting individual kata, which will feature eight athletes. Each nation may enter a maximum of 12 athletes (six per gender). This consists of a maximum of one athlete in the individual events (12). This rule does not apply to the winners of the 2021 Junior Pan American Games. The host nation, Chile, automatically qualifies the maximum number of athletes (12).

Venezuela, Panama and Colombia's athletes will be eligible to qualify through the 2023 Central American and Caribbean Championship, while Mexico will qualify through the North American Cup.

Qualification timeline

Qualification summary
The following is a list of qualified countries and athletes per event.

Men

Individual kata

-60 kg

-67 kg

-75 kg

-84 kg

+84 kg

Women

Individual kata

-50 kg

-55 kg

-61 kg

-68 kg

+68 kg

References

P
P
Qualification for the 2023 Pan American Games